Dula-Horton Cemetery is a historic family cemetery located near Grandin, Caldwell County, North Carolina.  It was established in 1835, and has been the site of interments for five generations (68 members) of the extended Dula-Horton family and their Jones family kinsmen. William Horton Bower (1850–1910), North Carolina Congressman from Lenoir, is buried there.

The cemetery was listed on the National Register of Historic Places in 2004.

References

External links
 

Cemeteries on the National Register of Historic Places in North Carolina
1835 establishments in North Carolina
Buildings and structures in Caldwell County, North Carolina
National Register of Historic Places in Caldwell County, North Carolina